Syneuodynerus is a genus of potter wasps with four species known from Near East, this genus is now regarded as having been synonimised with Euodynerus.

References

 Gusenleitner, J. 1997. Die Gattungen Syneuodynerus Blüthgen 1951 und Intereuodynerus gen. nov. im Nahen Osten (Hymenoptera, Eumenidae). Linzer Biologische Beiträge 29 (2) : 763-769. 

Biological pest control wasps
Potter wasps